Stapleford is a village and civil parish of  on the A119 road, in the East Hertfordshire district, in the county of Hertfordshire, England. Stapleford is located between Waterford and Watton-at-Stone in the Beane valley; the little river was forded at this point, giving rise to the village. Stapleford's parish church is St Mary's Church. Beane is a hamlet of Stapleford.

History
The placename occurs as Stapelford in an Exchequer document of 1210, lending weight to Walter William Skeat's suggestion that the ford site was marked by an upright stake, in Anglo-Saxon stapel.

In the early 1970s, John Marius Wilson described Stapleford as:"a parish in the district and county of Hertford; 2¾ miles N of Hertford r. station. It has a post-office under Hertford. Acres, 1,319. Real property, £1,622. Pop., 226. Houses, 45. The property is all in one estate. The living is a rectory in the diocese of Rochester. Value, £280.* Patron, A Smith, Esq. The church was repaired and enlarged in 1852. There is a national school.In 1831, majority of males were labourers and servants whilst the remaining were employers and professionals or into middling sorts or other occupations, this shows the social status of males in Stapleford during those times.

Stapleford's population is 567 according to 2011 census which includes 286 males and 281 females.

Statistics
In the 1880s majority of the men's occupation was within agriculture, whereas women were more into the domestic service. The professional occupation had the fewest people working within that sector for both genders. According to the Office of National Statistics, 67% of Stapleford's population are Christian.The following 26% classify themselves as nonreligious, 5% did not state their religious preference and the rest are the other religions. The village has many churches to accommodate to the Christians.The Office of National Statistics show that the people of Stapleford generally have very good health with 299 out of 567 classified as having very good health and the next big group having good health. As a whole the health rate is high, despite the 18 individuals who either have bad health or very bad health. The health rate in this area suggests that the village has very good health care sector. Lastly, information published by the 2011 Census stated that the largest ethnic group is White British, as 537 out of 567 people are of this ethnicity showing that the village is not multicultural.

Occupation

From the Occupational Structure of Males Pie Chart, it is seen that during 1881, 57% of the men's occupation was within agriculture showing that the area was rural. There were other occupations during that time but not as major as the agricultural sector. Within the Occupational structure for Females, 51% are in an Unknown Occupation this is most likely classified as being a Housewife which would be common during these times, as majority of other work was very physical, thus the demanding jobs would be for men. The next sector with the highest percentage of females was within Domestic Service.

Population
Census reports from 1880s to 2011 have illustrated within the "Total Population of Stapleford" graph that during 1880 to 1920 population growth was reasonably stable within 200 people. Thereafter, population growth increased by more than a half to 500 people by 1960 and then by 2011 increased by less than 100 people to reach the 2011 population of 567 people.

The population demographic in Stapleford has seen in the past the:mortality decline in the late 19th century was mainly due to the reduction of very high infant mortality rates: the presence or absence of large number of infants dying before their first birthday had little effect on overall age structures. During the twentieth century, declining fertility and improved life expectancy in later life significantly changed age structures.

Transport
For transportation, the village has to rely on cars or vans, however, in the past Stapleford, had a railway station for 15 years which made transportation easier, but had to close down due to accidents and incidents occurring. 2011 census data shows that only 19 out of 229 households do not have a car or van. On the other hand, the remaining households do have 1 or more cars, with 105 households having 2 cars or vans.

Economy
The economic activity within Stapleford of 2011 according to National Statistics shows that females of working age which is 24% of them were in part-time work whilst for full-time had 28%, 9% were in self-employment, 37% were economically inactive and around 2% of the population were unemployed. The case is different for men in this village as 80% of them were economically active. In terms of housing, the Village of Stapleford generally live in a whole house or bungalow as stated from the Office of National Statistics.

Places of interest

St Mary's Church Stapleford

This beautiful and historic church is part of the diocese of St Albans and marks special important events from baptisms to weddings. The church has a sense of community as church members can find out about village events by the Parish News that is released monthly. The Church school, though small is highly successful and involved in Church life. St Mary's is located on Church Lane and is open at weekends during daylight hours.

See also 
 Stapleford railway station

References

External links 
 Listed Buildings Register for Stapleford

Villages in Hertfordshire
Civil parishes in Hertfordshire
East Hertfordshire District